Polytaenium is a genus of ferns in the subfamily Vittarioideae of the family Pteridaceae. Species are native to Mexico and Southern America.

Species
, the Checklist of Ferns and Lycophytes of the World recognized the following species:

Polytaenium anetioides Benedict
Polytaenium cajenense (Desv.) Benedict
Polytaenium chlorosporum (Mickel & Beitel) E.H.Crane
Polytaenium citrifolium (L.) Schuettp., syn. Anetium citrifolium (L.) Splitg.
Polytaenium dussianum Benedict
Polytaenium feei (W.Schaffn. ex Fée) Maxon
Polytaenium guayanense (Hieron.) Alston
Polytaenium intramarginale (Baker ex Jenman) Alston
Polytaenium jenmanii Benedict
Polytaenium lineatum J.Sm.
Polytaenium ophioglossoides (Lellinger) S.Linds.
Polytaenium quadriseriatum Benedict
Polytaenium urbani (Brause) Alain

References

Pteridaceae
Fern genera